Shantilal Premchand Bhagat (1923 – 7 July 2017) was the Director of Eco-Justice Concerns for the Church of the Brethren and the denomination's representative to the United Nations. He was an ordained minister in the denomination. He was also the Brethren representative to the National Council of the Churches of Christ in the USA's Eco-Justice Working Group.

Biography 
Bhagat was from India. For sixteen years, he worked at the Rural Service Center in Anklesvar. He moved to the United States to work for the General Board. He took on a variety of roles for the organization including coordinator of Social Services for the Foreign Mission Commission, Community Development consultant, Asia representative, United Nations representative, Global Justice consultant, Education/Economic Justice consultant, staff and then director of Eco-Justice and Rural/Small Church Concerns. He continued with the General Board for over 30 years before his retirement.

Bhagat sought to expand upon the traditional Brethren support for pacifism to include environmental concerns, saying "Working on these... issues is part of the Brethren peace witness because we cannot be at peace unless we're at peace with the earth."
In 1990, Bhagat's book, Creation in Crisis was published. The book was especially designed for use as Sunday school material and small group discussion with study and discussion questions included, although it can also be read individually. Creation in Crisis was part of a wave of Ecotheology works which began in the 1980s and continued strongly in the 1990s. The book is included in many Ecotheology bibliographies.

The Parish Ministries Commission of the Church of the Brethren General Board commissioned Bhagat to write about racism and Christianity, culminating in his 1995 two-part work, Racism & the Church: Overcoming the Idolatry. In the same year, he was honored by the Black Church Committee in appreciation for his published works on the topic of race.

In published his book, Your Health and the Environment: A Christian Perspective. For Earth Day 1998, the National Council of Churches sent a packet to each congregation of each of its member denominations, 73,000 congregations in total. This packet included Bhagat's book, a two-session adult study guide for the book, and additional resources.

Bhagat participated in the 29 November 1970 ceremony which founded the Church of North India as a representative of the Church of the Brethren. From 2000 to 2001, Bhagat was part of a delegation from the American Church of the Brethren General Board which explored recognition of Brethren in that country who had joined the Church of North India in 1970 but later withdrew.

In his role as director of Eco-Justice Concerns for the Church of the Brethren General Board, Bhagat produced a newsletter entitled Between the Flood and the Rainbow. This was the first periodical published by the General Board to be published online. It ceased publication in 1997, but resumed in 2002 under the non-profit Ecumenical Eco-Justice Network with Bhagat continuing his editorial role.

Bhagat died on July 7, 2017 in La Verne, California, were he had lived the last years of his life.

Published works 
 
 
 
 
 
 
 
 
  - This packet includes: 12 study sessions, worship resources, glossary, leader’s guide, creation awareness chart, and segments on environmental racism and corporate responsibility.
 
 
 
  (Excerpt)

References

External links 
 Historical archives of the Rural Service Center at Anklesvar

2017 deaths
American Christian clergy
American Christian writers
American male writers of Indian descent
Church of the Brethren clergy
Ecotheology
20th-century Indian Christian clergy
Indian male writers
Indian non-fiction environmental writers
1923 births
Indian emigrants to the United States